The 2010 World Touring Car Championship season was the seventh season of the FIA World Touring Car Championship, and the sixth since its 2005 return. It began with the Race of Brazil at Curitiba on 7 March and ended with the Guia Race of Macau at the Guia Circuit on 21 November, after twenty-two races at eleven events. The championship was open to both Super 2000 and Diesel 2000 cars.

A new points system was introduced for the championship in 2010, in alignment with that used for both the Formula One World Championship and the World Rally Championship. The winner of each race received 25 points, continuing with 18, 15, 12, 10, 8, 6, 4, 2 and 1 point for 10th place.

In the week leading up to the final event in Macau, 2008 champion Yvan Muller was confirmed as Drivers' Champion after the BMWs of Augusto Farfus and title rival Andy Priaulx were excluded from the results of the event in Japan, after the FIA overturned a stewards' decision allowing the BMWs to run sequential gearboxes. Chevrolet was awarded the Manufacturers' Championship title.

Teams and drivers

The full season entry list was released on 19 February 2010.

Team and driver changes
Chevrolet replaced the retiring Nicola Larini in their three-car line-up with ex-SEAT Sport driver Yvan Muller. A fourth Chevrolet Cruze was entered in Italy for Leonel Pernía, with Nika Racing running the car under the Chevrolet Motorsport Sweden banner. Vincent Radermecker drove the car for the RML-run squad at the next race in Belgium, with Cacá Bueno driving it in the UK.

BMW Motorsport announced they were reducing their participation from a five-car team to a two-car team, with Augusto Farfus moving from BMW Team Germany to Team RBM to join Andy Priaulx. Former BMW Team Italy-Spain driver Alex Zanardi retired from the series, while former BMW Team Germany driver Jörg Müller raced in the Le Mans Series with Schnitzer.

SEAT Sport withdrew from the series for 2010, but helped Sunred to form a new team SR-Sport, for whom Independents champion Tom Coronel and ex-SEAT Sport drivers Jordi Gené, Tiago Monteiro and Gabriele Tarquini drove for.

Stefano D'Aste returned to Scuderia Proteam Motorsport, for whom he raced in 2005, 2006 and 2008, moving from Wiechers-Sport. His seat was taken by Mehdi Bennani, who moved from Exagon Engineering. D'Aste was joined at Proteam by Sergio Hernández, who returned to Proteam from BMW Team Italy-Spain. Fabio Fabiani raced an additional car for the team at his home event in Italy, just as he did in 2009.

Andrey Romanov rejoined the series and the Liqui Moly Team Engstler setup. He replaced Kristian Poulsen, who raced with his own Poulsen Motorsport team. Romanov could not drive at Brands Hatch for personal reasons, so was replaced by Tim Coronel.

Michel Nykjær joined SUNRED Engineering after racing in the WTCC for Perfection Racing at the 2009 Race of Germany. He replaced Tom Boardman, who returned to the BTCC, driving for Special Tuning (UK). Boardman returned to the WTCC with SUNRED for his home event. Fredy Barth joined the team from the SEAT León Eurocup, racing under the SEAT Swiss Team by SUNRED banner. Zengő Dension Motorsport joined the series, along with their driver, León Eurocup champion Norbert Michelisz, who drove the SUNRED prize car on two occasions – in 2008 and 2009.

British Touring Car team Bamboo Engineering joined the WTCC, along with their driver Harry Vaulkhard. Darryl O'Young, who drove in the FIA GT Championship with Prospeed Competition in 2009, was his teammate for most of this season, before Vaulkhard was forced to withdraw owing to a lack of sponsorship, and was replaced by Yukinori Taniguchi.

James Thompson, who drove for Lada Sport in 2009, was set to race at certain European rounds for Hartmann Racing, in addition to campaigns in the Danish Touring Car Championship and European Touring Car Cup, but left the team, whilst Lada did not return for 2010.

SEAT's Rickard Rydell elected to take a sabbatical from racing for the 2010 season. Instead, he became a TV pundit for Viasat Motor's coverage of the Swedish Touring Car Championship.

Jaap van Lagen returned to the Porsche Supercup, a series in which he finished seventh in 2008.

Without drives for 2010 were Lada's Kirill Ladygin, and Félix Porteiro, who drove for Proteam in 2009.

Maurer Motorsport were set to run three Chevrolet Lacettis at Marrakech for Moroccan racers Ismaïl Sbaï, Youssaf El Marnissi and Larbi Tadlaoui. Tadlaoui did not attend due to personal reasons, while El Marnissi crashed in the Friday test session.

Pierre-Yves Corthals made a one-off return to the series with his old team, Exagon Engineering, for his home event in Belgium.

Having been without a drive in any series, 2009 British Touring Car Champion Colin Turkington rejoined the series in Portugal with West Surrey Racing, with backing from eBay Motors.

Swedish championship team Polestar Racing and driver Robert Dahlgren raced once again at Brands Hatch, and also raced in Japan, in a nationally-homologated Volvo C30.

Calendar
A provisional calendar for the 2010 season was approved by the FIA World Council on 24 June 2009. The final calendar was published on 21 October 2009. The Race of Mexico at Autódromo Miguel E. Abed, Puebla, scheduled for 11 April, was cancelled in March due to security fears in the region. Series organisers looked for a replacement, but negotiations with interested event promoters did not meet with the championship’s logistic and promotional requirements, meaning the season was reduced to eleven events.

Calendar changes
 The Race of Belgium, which replaced the Race of France, was on the calendar for the first time since 2005. This time it was held at Zolder rather than Spa-Francorchamps.
 The Race of Portugal was moved to the Autódromo Internacional do Algarve.  
 The venue for the Race of Italy was changed from the Autodromo Enzo e Dino Ferrari near Imola back to the Autodromo Nazionale di Monza, which hosted the race from 2005 until 2008.

Results and standings

Races

Standings

Drivers' Championship

† — Drivers did not finish the race, but were classified as they completed over 90% of the race distance.

Manufacturers' Championship
The Manufacturers’ title was awarded to the highest scoring manufacturer, taking into account the results obtained by the two best placed cars per manufacturer at each race. All other cars of that same manufacturer were considered invisible as far as scoring points was concerned.

Yokohama Independents' Trophy
Eligibility for the award was determined by championship promoter KSO, taking into account the team's record, the driver's record and the car's technical characteristics.

 – After taking pole position at Brno, Colin Turkington was stripped of his independent status. Another change made at Brno was the removal of extra points to the championship, if the driver finished in the overall top ten, after Turkington claimed 33 bonus points at Brands Hatch.

Yokohama Teams' Trophy
All teams were eligible to compete for the award, however points were only awarded to the two best placed cars of each team, providing they were driven by
Independent drivers. Any other cars of that same team were considered to be invisible as far as scoring points was concerned.

WTCC Rookie Challenge
Any driver who had not previously completed a full season in the championship was eligible to score points in the Rookie Challenge. Points were awarded on a 10-8-6-5-4-3-2-1 basis  to the first eight finishers in the class  in each race.

References

External links
 www.fiawtcc.com - Official website of the World Touring Car Championship, as archived at web.archive.org on 14 December 2010
 2010 Sporting regulations – FIA World Touring Car Championship, argent.fia.com, as archived at www.webcitation.org
 Yokohama Independents' Trophies Regulations, www.fiawtcc.com, as archived at www.webcitation.org
 2010 FIA World Touring Car Championship standings, www.fiawtcc.com, as archived at www.webcitation.org 
 2010 Yokohama Independents' Trophy, Yokohama Teams' Trophy & WTCC Rookie Challenge standings, www.fiawtcc.com, as archived at www.webcitation.org
 2010 - Specific Regulations for Modified Production Cars on Circuits (Super-2000), argent.fia.com, as archived at www.webcitation.org
 2010 - Specific Regulations for Modified Production Diesel Cars on Circuits (Diesel 2000), argent.fia.com, as archived at www.webcitation.org